The Pope County Courthouse is the courthouse and government center of Pope County, Minnesota, United States, in the city of Glenwood.  It was built in 1930 as a replacement for a prior courthouse on the same site dating to 1879.  The current courthouse is listed on the National Register of Historic Places for having local significance in politics/government and architecture.  Its historic significance derives from being the long-serving seat of Pope County government and for being a well-preserved example of the replacement courthouses built in a few Minnesota counties in the 1930s.

See also
 National Register of Historic Places listings in Pope County, Minnesota

References

External links

 Pope County, Minnesota

Beaux-Arts architecture in Minnesota
Buildings and structures in Pope County, Minnesota
County courthouses in Minnesota
Courthouses on the National Register of Historic Places in Minnesota
Government buildings completed in 1930
National Register of Historic Places in Pope County, Minnesota